Araura College is a college and the only secondary school on Aitutaki, in the Cook Islands. The school has an enrollment of approximately two hundred students. It was established in February 1963.

References

Schools in the Cook Islands
Buildings and structures in the Cook Islands
Aitutaki
1963 establishments in the Cook Islands
Educational institutions established in 1963